William of Hauteville may refer to:
William Iron Arm
William of the Principate
William II, Duke of Apulia
William I of Sicily
William II of Sicily
William III of Sicily